Poznań Dębina railway station is a railway station serving the Wilda neighbourhood of the city of Poznań, in the Greater Poland Voivodeship, Poland. The station opened on 1 February 1870 and is located on the Kluczbork–Poznań railway. The train services are operated by Przewozy Regionalne.

History
After World War I the station was closed until 1938. In 1970 a new station opened, located east of the railway crossing on Wiśniowa street.

Train services
The station is served by the following service(s):

 InterRegio services (IR) Poznań Główny — Ostrów Wielkopolski — Łódź — Warszawa Główna
 Regional services (PR) Łódź Kaliska — Ostrów Wielkopolski — Poznań Główny

References

 This article is based upon a translation of the Polish language version as of June 2016.

External links

 

Dębina
Railway stations in Greater Poland Voivodeship
Railway stations served by Przewozy Regionalne InterRegio
Railway stations in Poland opened in 1883